Elections Yukon  is an independent agency that oversees elections and plebiscites in the Yukon including:
 all general elections and by-elections for the 19 Members of the Yukon's Legislative Assembly, according to the Elections Act.
 School board & school council elections and by-elections.
 all plebiscites

References

External links

Yukon
Politics of Yukon